The Politics of Emilia-Romagna, Italy takes place in a framework of a presidential representative democracy, whereby the President of Regional Government is the head of government, and of a pluriform multi-party system. Executive power is exercised by the Regional Government. Legislative power is vested in both the government and the Legislative Assembly.

The region has long been a stronghold of the Italian Communist Party and its successors, from the Democratic Party of the Left to the present-day Democratic Party, and is part of the so-called "Red belt", along with Tuscany, Marche and Umbria.

Executive branch
The Regional Government (Giunta Regionale) is presided by the President of the Region (Presidente della Regione), who is elected for a five-year term, and is composed by the President, the Ministers (Assessori), who are currently 12, including a vice president and one Under-Secretary for in President's office.

List of presidents

Legislative branch

The Legislative Assembly of Emilia-Romagna (Assemblea Legislativa dell'Emilia-Romagna) is composed of 50 members. 40 councillors are elected in provincial constituencies by proportional representation using the largest remainder method with a Droop quota and open lists, while 10 councillors (elected in bloc) come from a "regional list", including the President-elect. One seat is reserved for the candidate who comes second. If a coalition wins more than 50% of the total seats in the council with PR, only 5 candidates from the regional list will be chosen and the number of those elected in provincial constituencies will be 45. If the winning coalition receives less than 40% of votes special seats are added to the council to ensure a large majority for the President's coalition.

The council is elected for a five-year term, but, if the President suffers a vote of no confidence, resigns or dies, under the simul stabunt, simul cadent clause introduced in 1999 (literally they will stand together or they will fall together), also the council is dissolved and a snap election is called.

Local government

Provinces
Emilia-Romagna is divided in nine provinces, which are a traditional form of local administration in the region.

Socialist and communist ideas had an early diffusion in quite all the provinces around World War I. After the Fascist parenthesis, left-wing parties found their strongholds in Emilia-Romagna, also known as the "red region of Italy".

Municipalities
Tuscany is also divided in 331 comuni (municipalities), which have even more history, having been established in the Middle Ages when they were the main places of government. 17 comuni (9 provincial capitals) have more than 35,000 inhabitants.

Provincial capitals

Other municipalities with more than 35,000 inhabitants

Parties and elections

Latest regional election

In the latest regional election, which took place on 26 January 2020, Stefano Bonaccini (Democratic Party) was re-elected President of Emilia-Romagna, despite a strong challenge posed by Lucia Borgonzoni (Lega Nord Emilia–Romagna).

References

External links
Emilia-Romagna Region
Legislative Assembly of Emilia-Romagna
Constitution of Emilia-Romagna

 
Emilia-Romagna